Chiren is a village located in northwestern Bulgaria. It is a part of Vratsa Municipality, Vratsa Province.

Geography
The village is located approximately 15 kilometers to the north of town of Vratsa. Chiren is popular with places "Bojia most" ( 'God's bridge') and "Tigancheto" ( 'little frying pan'). These places are natural forms carved by the rivers. The other natural landmark in this area is the cave "Ponora".

Honour
Chiren Heights in Graham Land, Antarctica are named after the village.

Villages in Vratsa Province